A potée is a French culinary term which, in general, refers to any preparation cooked in an earthenware pot. More specifically, it refers to a soup or stew made of pork and vegetables, most frequently, cabbage and potatoes of which choucroute is the most characteristic.

A potée is an ancient and popular dish which is found in many local variations throughout Europe and which bears many different names (such as hochepot). It is similar to  garbure and pot-au-feu.

The meat most frequently used is pork in many forms–bacon, head, ribs, knuckle, tail, sausage, ham, etc., but one finds beef, mutton, lamb, veal, chicken and duck.  The vegetables used most often are winter vegetables such as cabbage, carrots, turnips, celery and potatoes.

There are numerous regional variations. Potée Lorraine is composed of pork, carrots, turnips, leeks and a whole cabbage previously blanched.  These are barely covered with water or stock and simmered for three hours.  Half an hour before it is removed from the heat, a large sausage is added.  Plain boiled potatoes are often served as an accompaniment.

See also
 Cabbage stew
 List of soups
 List of stews

References

French soups
Ancient dishes
Culinary terminology